Nigel Jeremy Morgan (25 September 1954, in Woking, Surrey – 17 November 2018, in Harrismith, South Africa) was a British-South African security consultant. A former British Army officer with close ties to South African intelligence, he was credited with exposing an attempted coup against the government of Equatorial Guinea in 2004.

Personal
Morgan was the son of Ronan 'Bowlegs' Morgan, a hard-drinking publisher who was a regular at El Vino on Fleet Street, and the nephew of rugby player Cliff Morgan. His mother Pamela, a manic-depressive, abandoned the family after Nigel's beloved older brother Malcolm was killed in a motorcycle accident in 1970.

Education
Schooled at Cranleigh, Morgan entered the Army in 1974 and joined the Irish Guards. He then read Politics at Durham University on a military bursary, where he was President of the Durham Union for Epiphany term of 1978. Per the conditions of the bursary, Morgan was required to complete a minimum period of service with the British Army after finishing his degree.

He finished his degree in 1978, receiving a 2.2.

Career
While based with his regiment in London, Morgan became familiar with many of the thinkers involved in Thatcherism, including John Hoskyns, a special adviser to Prime Minister Margaret Thatcher. He campaigned to have his commission rescinded – telling his commanding officer he 'couldn't command a tea trolley' – but was unsuccessful. On finally leaving he worked under Alfred Sherman at the Centre for Policy Studies but resigned in 1983.

Later in the decade he spent a year training as a Jesuit priest but left over his disagreements with the newly fashionable Liberation theology. What followed was stints prospecting for gold in the Yukon with a friend from the Scots Guards and a disastrous gold-buying venture in Liberia in which he lost $1  million of investors’ money on gold-coated brass. From 1993 he was based in South Africa as a freelance security consultant, where he became friends with politicians and figures in the intelligence community, and produced analysis for risk management firms in London. In 2000 he left for the Democratic Republic of the Congo to manage security at a diamond mine operated by the state-owned firm MIBA, but was forced to leave after receiving death threats likely related to him pointing out the repeated theft of diamonds by MIBA employees.

Wonga coup

In 2004 he was named in connection with the so-called 'Wonga plot', a botched coup attempt against President Teodoro Obiang Nguema Mbasogo, the dictator of oil-rich Equatorial Guinea. The case received international attention when Constantia resident Mark Thatcher was named as one of the financiers. Morgan was close friends with both Thatcher and Special Air Service officer turned mercenary Simon Mann.

Because Morgan had connections with the South African Secret Service, some of those involved in the planned coup reportedly assumed they must have the tacit support of the South African government. This apparently included Mann himself. As a matter of fact, Morgan was a double agent who had planted a mole, James Kershaw, to act as an assistant to Mann and feed him details of what was going on. Morgan, playing both sides, wrote up to 10 reports that ended up in the hands of contacts within South African intelligence, yet also took up to $10,000 from Mann for help in planning, before finally sending a red alert to the authorities. Mann and his co-conspirators would be arrested in Zimbabwe after their Boeing 727 stopped off in Harare to pick up weapons and equipment.

Morgan explained his actions by arguing that Mann's plot was amoral and he had told him not to go ahead with it. Claiming to having played only a 'peripheral' role in Mann's eventual arrest, he also suggested the plot had a high chance of failure, was in breach of international law, and would have hugely embarrassed the South African government, which justified his intervention.

Aftermath
Morgan later spent time in Mozambique, where he was active in wildlife preservation. In 2013, as spokesman for the Joaquin Chissano Foundation, he announced plans to set up an armed unit to prevent Rhino poaching. He also founded a security risk management firm based in Maputo, where he served as director. Morgan was eventually ousted from this role and, bitter and depressed, embarked on a 'massive bender' that resulted in him being placed in an induced coma.

Death
Having already spent many years as a heavy drinker, Morgan, though judged well enough to leave hospital, soon returned after he resumed drinking; dying from the accumulated damage to his liver. In 2019, a memorial service was held at Farm Street Church in London, followed by food and drink at the Cavalry and Guards Club.

References

1954 births
2018 deaths
South African people of British descent
British expatriates in South Africa
British expatriates in Mozambique
British intelligence operatives
Irish Guards officers
Presidents of the Durham Union
People educated at Cranleigh School
Alumni of Hatfield College, Durham